Noel Reynolds may refer to:
Noel Reynolds (priest) (died 2002), Irish Catholic priest
Noel B. Reynolds (born 1941), American political scientist